Tarcísio da Silva (born 1 March 1986), known as Tarcísio, is a Brazilian football player who plays for Académico de Viseu F.C.

Club career
He made his professional debut in the Segunda Liga for Freamunde on 24 August 2008 in a game against União de Leiria.

References

External links
 

1986 births
Sportspeople from Sergipe
Living people
Brazilian footballers
Club Sportivo Sergipe players
São Cristóvão de Futebol e Regatas players
S.C. Freamunde players
Brazilian expatriate footballers
Expatriate footballers in Portugal
Liga Portugal 2 players
S.C. Covilhã players
Moreirense F.C. players
G.D. Chaves players
C.D. Aves players
Association football midfielders